Aban Abdel Malek Mahmoud Elias was an Iraqi American civil engineer who was born in Iraq, lived in Denver, Colorado, then returned to Iraq. He was kidnapped on May 3, 2004, near his home in Baghdad. He was shown being held hostage in a video on Al Arabiya television station. While, blindfolded and posed against a stone wall, he was shown pleading for help. A transcript provided by Al Arabiya quoted him as saying in English:

He has not been seen or heard from since.

See also
List of kidnappings
List of people who disappeared

External links
 Templates story
 NBC News

2000s missing person cases
American people of Iraqi descent
Iraqi civil engineers
Missing person cases in Iraq
Year of birth missing